Mystery airships or phantom airships are a class of unidentified flying objects best known from a series of newspaper reports originating in the western United States and spreading east during late 1896 and early 1897. According to researcher Jerome Clark, airship sightings were reported worldwide during the 1880s and 1890s. Mystery airship reports are seen as a cultural predecessor to modern claims of extraterrestrial-piloted flying saucer-style UFOs.  Typical airship reports involved night time sightings of unidentified lights, but more detailed accounts reported ships comparable to a dirigible. 

Reports of the alleged crewmen and pilots usually described them as human-looking, although sometimes the crew claimed to be from Mars.  It was popularly believed that the mystery airships were the product of some inventor or genius who was not ready to make knowledge of his creation public.  For example, Thomas Edison was so widely speculated to be the mind behind the alleged airships that in 1897 he "was forced to issue a strongly worded statement" denying his responsibility.

It has been frequently argued that mystery airships are unlikely to represent test flights of real human-manufactured dirigibles as no record of successful sustained or long-range airship flights are known from the period and "it would have been impossible, not to mention irrational, to keep such a thing secret."  To the contrary, however, there were in fact several functional airships manufactured before the 1896–97 reports (e.g., Solomon Andrews made successful test flights of his "Aereon" in 1863), but their capabilities were far more limited than the mystery airships. Reece and others note that contemporary American newspapers of the "yellow journalism" era were more likely to print manufactured stories and hoaxes than are modern news sources, and editors of the late 1800s often would have expected the reader to understand that such stories were false. 

Most journalists of the period did not seem to take the airship reports very seriously, as after the major 1896–97 wave concluded, the subject quickly fell from public consciousness. The airship stories received further attention only after the 1896-97 newspaper reports were largely rediscovered in the mid 1960s and UFO investigators suggested the airships might represent earlier precursors to post-World War II UFO sightings.

The airship wave of 1896-1897

The best-known of the mystery airship waves began in California in 1896.  Afterwards, reports and accounts of similar airships came from other areas, generally moving eastward across the country.  Some accounts during this wave of airship reports claim that occupants were visible on some airships, and encounters with the pilots were reported as well.  These occupants often appeared to be human, though their behaviour, mannerisms and clothing were sometimes reported to be unusual.  Sometimes the apparent humans claimed to be from the planet Mars.

Historian Mike Dash described and summarized the 1896–1897 series of airship sightings, writing:

Specific cases 
The Sacramento Bee and the San Francisco Call reported the first sighting on November 18, 1896. Witnesses reported a light moving slowly over Sacramento on the evening of November 17 at an estimated 1,000-foot elevation. Some witnesses said they could see a dark shape behind the light. A witness named R.L. Lowery reported that he heard a voice from the craft issuing commands to increase elevation in order to avoid hitting a church steeple. Lowery added "in what was no doubt meant as a wink to the reader" that he believed the apparent captain to be referring to the tower of a local brewery, as there were no churches nearby. 

Lowery further described the craft as being powered by two men exerting themselves on bicycle pedals. Above the pedaling men seemed to be a passenger compartment, which lay under the main body of the dirigible. A light was mounted on the front end of the airship. Some witnesses reported the sound of singing as the craft passed overhead.

The November 19, 1896, edition of the Stockton, California, Daily Mail featured one of the earliest accounts of an alleged alien craft sighting. Colonel H.G. Shaw claimed that while driving his buggy through the countryside near Stockton, he came across what appeared to be a landed spacecraft. Shaw described it as having a metallic surface which was completely featureless apart from a rudder, and pointed ends. He estimated a diameter of 25 feet and said the vessel was around 150 feet in total length. Three slender, apparent extraterrestrials were said to approach from the craft while "emitting a strange warbling noise." 

The beings reportedly examined Shaw's buggy and then tried to physically force him to accompany them back to the airship. The aliens were said to give up after realizing they lacked the physical strength to force Shaw aboard. They supposedly fled back to their ship, which lifted off the ground and sped out of sight. Shaw believed that the beings were Martians sent to kidnap an earthling for unknowable but potentially nefarious purposes. This has been seen by some as an early attempt at alien abduction; it is apparently the first published account of explicitly extraterrestrial beings attempting to kidnap humans into their spacecraft.
 The mystery light reappeared over Sacramento on the evening of November 21 1896. It was also seen over Folsom, San Francisco, Oakland, Modesto, Manteca, Sebastopol and several other cities later that same evening and was reportedly viewed by hundreds of witnesses.
 One witness from Arkansas – allegedly a former state senator Harris – was supposedly told by an airship pilot (during the tensions leading up to the Spanish–American War) that the craft was bound for Cuba, to use its "Hotchkiss gun" to "kill Spaniards".
 In one account from Texas, three men reported an encounter with an airship and with "five peculiarly dressed men" who asserted that they were descendants of the lost tribes of Israel, and had learned English from the 1553 North Pole expedition led by Hugh Willoughby.
 On February 2, 1897, the Omaha Bee reported an airship sighting over Hastings, Nebraska, the previous day.
 An article in the Albion Weekly News reported that two witnesses saw an airship crash just inches from where they were standing. The airship suddenly disappeared, with a man standing where the vessel had been. The airship pilot showed the men a small device that supposedly enabled him to shrink the airship small enough to store the vessel in his pocket. A rival newspaper, the Wilsonville Review, playfully claimed that its own editor was an additional witness to the incident and that he heard the pilot say "Weiver eht rof ebircsbus!" The phrase he allegedly heard  is "subscribe for the Review" spelled backwards.
 On April 10, 1897, the St. Louis Post-Dispatch published a story reporting that one W.H. Hopkins encountered a grounded airship about 20 feet in length and 8 feet in diameter near the outskirts of Springfield, Missouri. The vehicle was apparently propelled by three large propellers and crewed by a beautiful, nude woman and a bearded man, also nude. Hopkins attempted with some difficulty to communicate with the crew in order to ascertain their origins. Eventually they understood what Hopkins was asking of them and they both pointed to the sky and "uttered something that sounded like the word Mars."
 An April 16, 1897, a story published by the Table Rock Argus claimed that a group of "anonymous but reliable" witnesses had seen an airship sailing overhead. The craft had many passengers. The witnesses claimed that among these passengers was a woman tied to a chair, a woman attending her, and a man with a pistol guarding their apparent prisoner. Before the witnesses thought to contact the authorities, the airship was already gone.
 An account from Aurora, Texas, related in the Dallas Morning News on April 19, 1897, reported that a couple of days before, an airship had smashed into a windmill – later determined to be a sump pump – belonging to a Judge Proctor, then crashed. The occupant was dead and mangled, but the story reported that the presumed pilot was clearly "not an inhabitant of this world." Strange "hieroglyphic" figures were seen on the wreckage, which resembled "a mixture of aluminum and silver ... it must have weighed several tons." In the 20th century, unusual metallic material recovered from the presumed crash site was shown to contain a percentage of aluminum and iron admixed. The story ended by noting that the pilot was given a "Christian burial" in the town cemetery.
 An account by Alexander Hamilton of Leroy, Kansas, supposedly occurred around April 19, 1897, and was published in the Yates Center Farmer's Advocate of April 23. Hamilton, his son and a tenant witnessed an airship hovering over his cattle pen. Upon closer examination, the witnesses realized that a red "cable" from the airship had lassoed a heifer, but had also become entangled in the pen's fence. After trying unsuccessfully to free the heifer, Hamilton cut loose a portion of the fence, then "stood in amazement to see the ship, cow and all rise slowly and sail off." Some have suggested this was the earliest report of cattle mutilation. In 1982, however, UFO researcher Jerome Clark debunked this story, and confirmed via interviews and Hamilton's own affidavit that the story was a successful attempt to win a Liar's Club competition to create the most outlandish tall tale.

Other cases

Before 1896
Charles Fort cited a mystery airship sighting in Copiapo, Chile. It was described as a gigantic, shining bird driven by a noisy motor.

In a variation of the usual airship, on July 29, 1880 two witnesses in Louisville, Kentucky saw a flying object described as "a man surrounded by machinery which he seemed to be working with his hands" with wings protruding from his back. Merely a month later, a similar sighting happened in New Jersey. It was written at the New York Times that "it was apparently a man with bat's wings and improved frog's legs... the monster waved his wings in answer to the whistle of a locomotive."

1887 wave
Several unusual aerial events were reported from the East Coast of the U.S. in 1887.

1909–1913
There was a series of mystery airship sightings in 1909 in New England, New Zealand and various European locations. Later reports came from the United Kingdom in 1912 and 1913. However, by this time airship technology was well advanced (Count Ferdinand von Zeppelin had been flying his massive passenger-carrying airships for nearly a decade by then), making the prospect that these may have been small, private airships rather than evidence of extraterrestrial visitation or newspaper hoaxes more reasonable.

Wallace Tillinghast, a Massachusetts businessman, gained notoriety for claims he was responsible for the 1909 wave due to an airship he had built, but his claims were never substantiated.

Later research
Jerome Clark writes, "One curious feature of the post-1887 airship waves was the failure of each to stick in historical memory. Although 1909, for example, brought a flood of sightings worldwide and attendant discussion and speculation, contemporary accounts do not allude to the hugely publicized events of little more than a decade earlier."

Clark writes that any attempt to "uncover the truth about the late 19th-century airship scare comes up against some unhappy realities: newspaper coverage was unreliable; no independent investigators ('airshipologists') spoke directly with alleged witnesses or attempted to verify or debunk their testimony; and, with a single unsatisfactory exception, no eyewitness was ever interviewed even in the 1950s, when some were presumably still living."

The "single unsatisfactory exception" Clark cites is a former San Francisco Chronicle employee interviewed via telephone by Edward J. Ruppelt in 1952. Ruppelt wrote that the man "had been a copy boy…and remembered the incident, but time had cancelled out the details. He did tell me that he, the editor of the paper, and the news staff had seen 'the ship', as he referred to the UFO. His story, even though it was fifty-six years old, smacked of others I'd heard when he said that no one at the newspaper ever told anyone what they had seen; they didn't want people to think they were 'crazy'."

Jacobs notes, "Most arguments against the airship idea came from individuals who assumed that the witnesses did not see what they claimed to see. This is the crucial link between the 1896–97 phenomenon and the modern unidentified flying object phenomenon beginning in 1947. It also was central to the debate over whether unidentified flying objects constituted a unique phenomenon."

In 2009, American author J. Allan Danelek wrote a book entitled The Great Airship of 1897 in which he made the case that the mystery airship was the work of an unknown individual, possibly funded by a wealthy investor from San Francisco, to build an airship prototype as a test vehicle for a later series of larger, passenger-carrying airships. In the work, Danelek demonstrates how the craft might have been built using materials and technologies available in 1896 (including speculative line drawings and technical details). The ship, Danelek proposes, was built in secret to safeguard its design from patent infringement as well as to protect investors in case of failure. 

Noting that the flights were initially seen over California and only later over the Midwest, he speculates that the inventor was making a series of short test flights, moving from west to east and following the main railway lines for logistical support, and that it was these experimental flights that formed the basis for many – though not all – of the newspaper accounts from the era. Danelek also notes that the reports ended abruptly in mid-April 1897, suggesting that the craft may have met with disaster, effectively ending the venture and permitting the sightings to fall into the realm of mythology.

Explanations

Hoaxes or misidentification
During the 1896–97 wave, there were many attempts to explain the airship sightings, including suggestions of hoaxes, pranks, publicity stunts and hallucinations.  One man suggested the airships were swarms of lightning beetles misidentified by observers.

Jacobs believes that many airship tales originated with "enterprising reporters perpetrating journalistic hoaxes." He notes that many of these accounts "are easy to identify because of their tongue-in-cheek tone, and accent on the sensational." Furthermore, in many such newspaper hoaxes, the author makes his intent obvious "by saying – in the last line – that he was writing from an insane asylum (or something to that effect)."

Human airships
Some argued that the airship reports were genuine accounts.  Steerable airships had been publicly flown in the U.S. since the Aereon in 1863, and numerous inventors were working on airship and aircraft designs (the idea that a secretive inventor might have developed a viable craft with advanced capabilities was the focus of Jules Verne's 1886 novel Robur the Conqueror). In fact, two French Army officers and engineers, Arthur Krebs and Charles Renard, had successfully flown in an electric-powered airship called La France as early as 1884, making no fewer than seven successful flights in the craft over an eleven-month period. 

Also during the 1896–97 period, David Schwarz built an aluminum-skinned airship in Germany that successfully flew over Tempelhof Field before being irreparably damaged during a hard landing. Both events clearly demonstrated that the technology to build a practical airship existed during the period in question, though if reports of the capabilities of the California and Midwest airship sighted in 1896–97 are true, it would have been considerably more advanced than any airship built up to that time.

Several individuals, including Lyman Gilmore and Charles Dellschau, were later identified as possible candidates for being involved in the design and construction of the airships, although little evidence was found in support of these ideas.

Claims of extraterrestrial origin
Early sources citing the extraterrestrial hypothesis, all from 1897, include the Washington Times, which speculated that the airships were "a reconnoitering party from Mars"; and the Saint Louis Post-Dispatch, which suggested of the airships, "these may be visitors from Mars, fearful, at the last, of invading the planet they have been seeking."  In 1909, a letter printed in the Otago Daily Times (New Zealand) suggested that the mystery airship sightings then being reported in that country were due to Martian "atomic-powered spaceships."

See also
 Airship
 Ghost rockets
 List of reported UFO sightings

Footnotes

References
 .
 .
 .
 .
 .
 .
 .
 .
 .
 , 213 pp.
 .
 .

Unidentified flying objects
Airships
1890s in the United States